Terrigal Parish is a civil Parish of Gregory County in New South Wales.

The parish is on Marthaguy Creek on the eastern boundary of the Macquarie Marshes Nature Reserve.

References

Parishes of New South Wales